Lerenteé Zavonne McCray (born August 26, 1990) is an American football defensive end who is a free agent. He played college football at Florida. McCray was signed by the Denver Broncos as an undrafted free agent in 2013. He has also been a member of the Green Bay Packers and Buffalo Bills.

Early years
McCray attended Dunnellon High School, where he played wide receiver, linebacker, and on special teams. As a junior, he recorded 97 tackles and 11 sacks. McCray produced 118 tackles and nine sacks during his senior year, averaging 17 tackles a game. Rivals.com ranked him as the 10th best outside linebacker and a four-star prospect.

College career
McCray played college football for the Florida Gators football team from 2008 to 2012.

Professional career

Denver Broncos
After going undrafted in the 2013 NFL Draft, McCray signed with the Denver Broncos on April 27, 2013. In the 2015 season, McCray and the Broncos reached Super Bowl 50.  The Broncos would defeat the Carolina Panthers by a score of 24–10.

Green Bay Packers
McCray was signed by the Green Bay Packers on April 18, 2016.

Buffalo Bills
On August 30, 2016, McCray was traded to the Buffalo Bills in exchange for a conditional seventh round draft pick in 2018.

Jacksonville Jaguars
On March 9, 2017, McCray signed a one-year contract with the Jacksonville Jaguars.

On March 16, 2018, McCray re-signed with the Jaguars on a one-year contract.

On November 18, 2019, McCray was placed on injured reserve.

McCray re-signed with the Jaguars on March 30, 2020. On August 1, 2020, he announced he would opt out of the 2020 season due to the COVID-19 pandemic.

Statistics
Source: NFL.com

Legal issues
On January 16, 2022, McCray was arrested in Tavares, Florida after leading police on a high-speed chase. McCray had been going 88 mph in a 50 mph zone and flipped police offers off before fleeing. He currently faces a second degree felony of fleeing and eluding police with disregard of safety to persons and property.

References

External links
Jacksonville Jaguars bio
 Buffalo Bills bio
 
 
 
 

1990 births
Living people
Players of American football from Gainesville, Florida
People from Dunnellon, Florida
American football linebackers
Florida Gators football players
Denver Broncos players
Green Bay Packers players
Buffalo Bills players
Jacksonville Jaguars players